Indian Creek is a stream in Thurston County in the U.S. state of Washington. It is a 3-mile Olympian creek. Its source is a wetland along the northern end of South Bay Road. It enters Budd Inlet at East Bay, having first joined with Moxlie Creek. It can most easily be accessed between Boulevard Road and Frederick Road along the Karen Fraser Woodland Trail. American Indian settlements near the creek's course may account for the name.

Runoff from Interstate-5 is treated at a stormwater facility before entering the creek.

Fecal coliform bacteria have been detected in unsafe levels in the creek.

References 

Geography of Olympia, Washington
Rivers of Thurston County, Washington
Rivers of Washington (state)